Cynwyd was a railway station in Cynwyd, Denbighshire, Wales on the Ruabon Barmouth Line. It was to have closed to passengers on Monday 18 January 1965 but closed prematurely on 14 December 1964 due to flood damage.

Neighbouring stations

References

Further reading

External links
 Cynwyd station on navigable 1946 O.S. map

Beeching closures in Wales
Railway stations in Great Britain opened in 1866
Railway stations in Great Britain closed in 1964
Disused railway stations in Denbighshire
Former Great Western Railway stations